Bradley Steven Perry (born November 23, 1998) is an American actor. He played the role of Gabe Duncan on the Disney Channel family sitcom Good Luck Charlie, and the role of Roger Ellison in Disney's High School Musical spin-off film Sharpay's Fabulous Adventure. Following this, Perry co-starred on the Disney XD comedies Mighty Med and its spinoff Lab Rats: Elite Force, where he played the role of Kaz.

Career
In 2008, Perry began his professional acting career at the age of 10 with small roles in the films Choose Connor, and Magnificent Max.  The following year, he made his television debut with a guest-starring role on the CBS crime-drama Without a Trace.  Over the next year, Perry continued to appear in small comedic roles in such films as  The Goods: Live Hard, Sell Hard, Opposite Day, and Old Dogs.

In 2010, Perry starred on the Disney Channel family sitcom Good Luck Charlie.  On the series, Perry played the mischievous and scheming Gabe Duncan, the third of five siblings in the Duncan family. In 2011, he starred in the movie Good Luck Charlie, It's Christmas!

In the same year, Perry co-starred in the Disney Channel original movie  Sharpay's Fabulous Adventure.  In the film, Perry played Roger Ellison, a precocious young dog owner and Sharpay's rival, competing to get his dog a starring role on Broadway. In 2013, Perry began playing Kaz on the Disney XD show Mighty Med alongside Jake Short and Paris Berelc.

In 2014, Perry starred as Jack Parker in the Disney XD Original Movie Pants on Fire, which premiered on Disney XD on November 9, 2014. In 2015, Mighty Med ended its run, but Perry continued to play Kaz on the spinoff series Lab Rats: Elite Force, which premiered in March 2016.
In 2017, he appeared in Descendants: Wicked World as Zevon.

On November 16, 2022, Perry started a podcast called Hit the Brake with Jake Short.

Personal life
Perry lives in Southern California with his parents and three older sisters. He was homeschooled on the set of Good Luck Charlie and played on a local baseball team in his free time.  Perry is also a fan of the Boston Red Sox and the New England Patriots and appeared in an NBC Sunday Night Football television promo as "The Patriots Kid".

Education
In 2021, Perry graduated from the University of Southern California.

Filmography

Awards and nominations

References

External links

 
 

1998 births
21st-century American male actors
American male child actors
Place of birth missing (living people)
American male film actors
American male television actors
Living people
Male actors from California